Mount Jacquinot is a pyramidal peak,  high, with exposed rock on its north side, lying  south of Cape Legoupil and  east of Huon Bay, on the north side of Trinity Peninsula, Antarctica. It was discovered by a French expedition, 1837–40, under Captain Jules Dumont d'Urville, who named it for Lieutenant Charles Jacquinot, the commander of the expedition corvette Zelée.

There was some controversy regarding claims of who found the continent first — Edward Bransfield or Nathaniel Palmer. In these debates, Mount Jacquinot figured prominently.

At present the military personnel of the Antarctic Military Base Bernardo Ohiggins makes the ascent to this mountain as part of their training.
Estimated time of ascension under normal conditions reaches approximately one hour.

References

Rock formations of the Trinity Peninsula

IMG_20181219_153436083_HDR.jpg